Wachirabenchathat Park, or often spelled Vachirabenjatas Park, also popularly known as State Railway Public Park (สวนรถไฟ, read suan rot fai) is a name of public park in Chatuchak district, Bangkok, Thailand. The park borders on the Queen Sirikit Park and Chatuchak Park, and it is also the largest park of the complex, bounded by Kamphaeng Phet 3 road and Kamphaeng Phet 2 road with Soi Nikhom Rotfai Sai 1 near PTT Head Office and Ministry of Energy. It is one of the most popular parks in Bangkok.

Formerly being the State Railway of Thailand (SRT)'s golf course, the  plot of land was converted into a public park for recreational activities and doing exercises of the people living in the vicinity. Its name means "Vajira's 50", since it was made on the occasion of His Majesty King Vajiralongkorn (Rama X)'s 50th birthday in 2002 (while he was still the Crown Prince of Thailand).

Some parts of the old golf course were conserved for children's golf practices. The park is commonly used for biking. It has a winding three-kilometer track for walking and biking around the park. At the start of bike track, there is a rental shop where visitors can rent bicycles for riding. Near the bike track, there is a lake where people can rent paddleboats to go around the lake.
 In the park, there is a beautiful butterfly garden and insectarium for visitor's relaxation and education. The other interesting point is a miniature town. The town consists of Bangkok's famous buildings and tourist attractions in scaled-down version. It was created for children to learn about traffic rules by riding a bicycle in this area.
 Some parts of the area used for sporting ground, swimming pool and camping site to those interested can use for bird watching activity as there are plenty of big trees in the park which creates good natural habitat for various kinds of birds.

Besides, the southeast part of the park is also home to the Buddhadasa Indapanno Archives (BIA), also known as Suan Mokkh Bangkok, a Buddhadāsa Bhikkhu's Dharma learning and edutainment center.

In 2015, Bang Sue Environmental Education and Conservation Center (EECC) was built and designed in accordance with the existing environment nearby (Chatuchak, Bang Sue, Phaya Thai) on the northwest reservoir of the park. The EECC project is housed an environmental education, especially aquatic plants and ecology conservation center, which aim to educate and raise visitor's awareness on the importance of environmental resources. The most amazing is a large artificial waterfall-façade facing the park.

Gallery

References

External links
 Wachirabenchatat Park Information

Parks in Bangkok
Chatuchak district